The Škofja Loka Passion Play is the oldest play in Slovene. In its current form, it was a penitential Passion procession. It was written on the basis of an older tradition in 1715, with minor corrections until 1727, by Father Romuald (Lovrenc Marusič; 1676–1748), a Capuchin monk who lived for a period in the Škofja Loka Capuchin monastery in the town of Škofja Loka. The passion presents Biblical stories, particularly from the life of Jesus. It consists of 869 verses, written in the old Škofja Loka dialect. They are divided into 13 tableaux. It belongs to the Baroque period and represents the oldest preserved director's book in the world. The play's manuscript is kept by the Škofja Loka monastery.

The play was originally staged on Good Friday each year until 1751. After almost three hundred years, it was presented again in 1936 as part of an exhibition, and revived in 1999, 2000, 2009, and 2015. The first two reprisals were directed by Marjan Kokalj, and the latest by Borut Gartner. They were performed by around 640 amateur actors and actresses, among them 80 cavalrymen. The tableaux were divided into 20 scenes. The National Youth Council of Slovenia bestowed the Municipality of Škofja Loka a special recognition for a volunteer project in 2010, after the municipality had organised the play in the previous year. In 2008, the performance has been entered in the Slovenian intangible cultural heritage register. The play will be performed again in 2021. Its reprisals in Škofja Loka are the largest open-air theatre productions in Slovenia.

See also
Oberammergau Passion Play

References

External links
 
 ePassion: The Škofja Loka Passion Play. Slovenian Academy of Sciences and Arts. Retrieved 8 May 2012. Contains transcriptions of the play, a video of the play's reprisal in 1999, and scholarly articles.

1715 plays
Slovene-language plays
Cultural heritage of Slovenia
Christian plays
Plays based on the Bible
Plays set in the 1st century
History of theatre
Volunteering in Slovenia
Cultural history of Slovenia
Tourist attractions in Slovenia
Observances in Slovenia
Street theatre
Škofja Loka
1936 in Slovenia
1999 in Slovenia
2000 in Slovenia
2009 in Slovenia
2015 in Slovenia
2021 in Slovenia
Intangible Cultural Heritage of Humanity
Holy Week processions